Decision Sciences is a peer-reviewed academic journal covering research about decision making within the boundaries of an organization, as well as decisions involving inter-firm coordination. According to the 2010 Journal Citation Reports, Decision Sciences is ranked 40th out of 140 journals in the category "Management"  and ranked in the B category (on a scale from A+ to D) by the scientific journal ranking JOURQUAL (German Academic Association for Business Research/VHB) in 2015. Decision Sciences is published by Wiley-Blackwell on behalf of the Decision Sciences Institute. The current editors are Xenophon Koufteros (since 2019) and Sri Talluri (since 2020).

Decision Sciences is associated with the Decision Sciences Journal of Innovative Education.

References

External links 
 

Wiley-Blackwell academic journals
English-language journals
Quarterly journals
Publications established in 1970
Business and management journals
Information systems journals